William Michael "Mike" Lynn (born 1958) is the Burton M. Sack Professor in Food & Beverage Management in Cornell University's School of Hotel Administration. He has a Ph.D. in Social Psychology from Ohio State University. Much of his research deals with the study of tipping at restaurants. Lynn is currently on the editorial board of the Journal of the Academy of Marketing Science. He is the editor-in-chief of the Cornell Hospitality Quarterly.

Michael Lynn received the 2004 W. Bradford Wiley Memorial Best Research Paper of the Year Award from the International Council on Hotel, Restaurant, and Institutional Education.

References

External links 
Wm. Michael Lynn's website

1958 births
Living people
Ohio State University alumni
Cornell University faculty
Marketing theorists